Mechanicsburg is the name of four unincorporated communities in the state of Indiana:
Mechanicsburg, Boone County, Indiana
Mechanicsburg, Clay County, Indiana
Mechanicsburg, Henry County, Indiana
Mechanicsburg, Decatur County, Indiana